14th Reconnaissance Squadron may refer to:

 The 904th Air Refueling Squadron, designated the 14th Reconnaissance Squadron (Heavy) from January 1941 to April 1942. 
 The 14th Fighter Squadron, designated the 14th Reconnaissance Squadron (Photographic) from November 1947 to June 1949.

See also 
 The 14th Photographic Reconnaissance Squadron 
 The 14th Tactical Reconnaissance Squadron